Bolesław Napierała (September 1909 – 1976) was a Polish cycling champion, twice winner of the Tour de Pologne. He was born in Marten, Germany to a family of Polish immigrants, and in 1918, when Poland regained independence, the family moved back to their homeland. However, after a few years, the Napieralas left Poland again, to Lens in France. It was there that Boleslaw for the first time saw cyclists, during Tour de France. Fascinated by them, he decided to take up cycling himself, helped by his famous neighbor, Luxemburg cyclist Nicolas Frantz.

Napierala, nicknamed Road Tiger, cycled for the teams Fort Bema Warszawa, and Sarmata Warszawa. He twice won Tour de Pologne (1937, 1939), for 15 days was in leader's jersey, and in the 1937 tour, he was a leader from start to finish. In 1939, a month after winning Tour de Pologne, World War II broke out. After the war, Napierala never returned to his late 1930s form.

References

External links 
 Boleslaw Napierala at cyclingranking.com
 A photo of Napierala during the first International Cycling Race Warsaw-Prague-Warsaw (1948)

1909 births
1976 deaths
Polish male cyclists
Sportspeople from Dortmund
German people of Polish descent